Jabkenice is a municipality and village in Mladá Boleslav District in the Central Bohemian Region of the Czech Republic. It has about 500 inhabitants.

Etymology
The name was probably derived from the Czech words jablko ("apple") and jabloň ("apple tree").

Geography
It lies in a flat landscape in the Jizera Table. The Jabkenický Brook flows through the municipality and supplies a system of ponds.

History
The first written mention of Jabkenice is from 1352. From 1924 to 1950, it was called Jablkynice.

Sights
The landmark of Jabkenice is the Church of the Nativity of the Virgin Mary. It is a Gothic cemetery church from the 13th century. Next to the church is a separate wooden bell tower.

Jabkenice Lodge next to a large game park was built for the Thurn und Taxis family as the seat of the forestry office. The building became known as the last residence of Bedřich Smetana, who wrote some of his most famous works here. Today, the Bedřich Smetana Memorial with a museum about his life and work is located here.

Notable people
Bedřich Smetana (1824–1884), composer; lived and worked here in 1875–1884

References

External links

Villages in Mladá Boleslav District